Immaculate Conception Ukrainian High School was a private, Ukrainian Catholic high school in Warren, Michigan.

History

Immaculate Conception Ukrainian High School was established in 1959.  It was the first Ukrainian Catholic co-educational high school in the United States.

It was closed in 2008, primarily due to budgetary constraints. 
It was associated with the Immaculate Conception Ukrainian Catholic Church.

References

External links
School Website 

Ukrainian-American culture in Michigan
Schools in Macomb County, Michigan
Educational institutions established in 1959
Catholic elementary schools in Michigan
Ukrainian Greek Catholic Church
Educational institutions disestablished in 2008
Defunct schools in Michigan
1959 establishments in Michigan
Ukrainian Catholic Church in the United States
Defunct Catholic secondary schools in Michigan
2008 disestablishments in Michigan